Graham Kelly (born 31 October 1991) is an Irish professional footballer currently playing for Essendon Royals. He previously played for Derby County, Bray Wanderers (2 spells), Salthill Devon, Athlone Town and St Patrick's Athletic.

Career

Early career
Kelly began his career playing youth football with Whitechurch United in the Dublin suburb of Rathfarnham. He then joined another Dublin club, Lourdes Celtic in Kimmage. His performances for Lourdes led to a move to EFL Championship side Derby County in 2008. He joined fellow Irishmen Jeff Hendrick, Mark O'Brien and Ryan Connolly among others at Derby's youth setup. After playing in the youth teams for two seasons, Kelly was offered his first professional contract at the club in July 2010, given the number 40 shirt. He was loaned out to League of Ireland Premier Division club Bray Wanderers for the remaining four months of the season. He played in four league games and two Promotion/relegation play-off games for Bray, scoring once. He returned to Derby from November 2010 until January 2011, when he came to an agreement with the club to terminate his contract in order to return to Ireland and sign for Bray on a permanent basis for the 2011 season.

Bray Wanderers
After helping Wanderers stay in the Premier Division during his loan spell, Kelly signed a permanent deal with the Seagulls in February 2011. His first full season in senior football was a successful one for Kelly and Bray, as he played 17 games and scored 2 goals as his side finished 6th in the league, qualifying for the 2012 Setanta Sports Cup. 2012 turned out to be a less memorable year for Kelly and Bray however, as they finished 10th and Kelly only featured in 6 league games, 11 in all competitions.

First Division spell
Following his lack of playing time with Bray in 2012, Kelly took a step down from the Premier Division, going on an unsuccessful trial with Athlone Town and then another with UCD before signing for Galway side Salthill Devon for the 2013 League of Ireland First Division season. After 10 games and 2 goals for Salthill, Kelly joined Athlone Town, at that point managed by Roddy Collins, during the summer transfer window of 2013. Kelly featured 7 times as Athlone won the First Division title on 27 September 2013, the first silverware of his career.

Return to Bray
Following his successful year in the First Division, Kelly re-signed for Bray Wanderers ahead of the 2014 season. Bray had narrowly avoided relegation in Kelly's season away from the club and they were in a relegation battle again in 2014, avoiding the playoff spot by finishing 1 point ahead of UCD, with Kelly featuring in 30 of the club's 33 league games as he emerged as a key player for Wanderers. Kelly stayed on for the 2015 season with Bray in what turned out to be a hugely turbulent season for the club as they went through six managers during the season. Despite this, the club finished in 8th place and reached the semi final of the 2015 FAI Cup, narrowly losing 1–0 to Cork City at the Carlisle Grounds.

St Patrick's Athletic
On 21 November 2015, Kelly was announced alongside Mark Timlin and Keith Treacy as new signings for St Patrick's Athletic ahead of the 2016 season. With the Saints expected to challenge for the league title again, or earn a European place as a minimum, the league season turned out to be a disappointment as they finished 7th. However, they got to the FAI Cup semi final and also won the 2017 League of Ireland Cup on 20 September 2016, beating Limerick 4–1 in the final with Kelly scoring the fourth in injury time. The season saw Kelly's first experience of European football as he played in all 4 games in the Saints' UEFA Europa League campaign as they knocked out Jeunesse Esch of Luxembourg before being beaten 2–1 on aggregate by Dinamo Minsk of Belarus.

With the Saints out of European competitions for the 2017 season for the first time since 2010, the club's budget took a cut and along with the new league structure that saw three clubs relegated to the First Division, the club was set for a relegation battle and Kelly sought an improvement in his game for the season, challenging himself to improve his goalscoring. With the club at the bottom of the table midway through the season, Kelly played an important role in the team in the second half of the season. He scored 4 league goals (twice as many as the previous season), including vital goals in wins against Derry City and Finn Harps as the Saints stayed up on the final day of the season with a 1–1 draw away to Derry City.
On 23 November 2017, Kelly, along with Conan Byrne, Ian Bermingham and Ryan Brennan, signed a new contract with Pats to keep him at the club for the 2018 season. 2018 turned out to be a disappointing year for Kelly as he struggled to keep his place in the team, making 14 league appearances (just 6 of those being starts) with the Saints having played 31 league games, on 19 September, it was announced that Kelly had left the club by mutual consent.

Honours

Club
League of Ireland First Division: (1)
Athlone Town – 2013
League of Ireland Cup: (1)
St Patrick's Athletic — 2016

Career statistics 
Professional appearances – correct as of 27 September 2021.

References

External links

1991 births
Living people
People from Rathfarnham
Sportspeople from South Dublin (county)
Association footballers from County Dublin
Republic of Ireland association footballers
Derby County F.C. players
Bray Wanderers F.C. players
Salthill Devon F.C. players
Athlone Town A.F.C. players
St Patrick's Athletic F.C. players
League of Ireland players
Association football midfielders